Radulf was the Duke of Thuringia (dux Thoringiae) from 632 or 633 (certainly before 634) until his death after 642. 

According to the Chronicle of Fredegar, he was a son of one Chamar, a Frankish aristocrat, and rose to power under the Merovingian king Dagobert I, who appointed him as dux in the former Thuringian kingdom which Francia had conquered in 531. 

His installation was meant to protect the eastern border of the Frankish realm against the threatening Wends under Samo, who had defeated the king at the 631 Battle of Wogastisburg and formed an alliance with Dervan, prince of the Sorbian tribes settling in the adjacent region east of the Saale river. Radulf fought successfully against the Slavs, but subsequently refused the incorporation of the secured territories into the Austrasian kingdom. To retain his independence he allied with Fara, a descendant of the powerful Agilolfing dynasty in Bavaria who ruled over large estates along the Main river. 

About 640 King Sigebert III of Austrasia with his Mayors of the Palace, Adalgisel and Grimoald the Elder, marched against the insurgents and at first easily routed Fara's troops, while the Agilolfing himself was killed in battle. Reaching Thuringia however, Duke Radulf, entrenched in his fortress at the Unstrut river, was not overcome, partially because he had gained the support of significant numbers of the king's forces. In 642, he rebelled against Sigebert and defeated his army, taking the title of rex or king of Thuringia. His success is usually considered an indicator of the roi fainéant phenomenon and of undoing of the Merovingians' accomplishments. His sons, Theotbald and Heden I, succeeded him.

Sources
Reuter, Timothy. Germany in the Early Middle Ages 800–1056. New York: Longman, 1991.

Notes

Rulers of Thuringia
7th-century Frankish nobility
7th-century Germanic people 
7th-century rulers in Europe
Merovingian dynasty
Place of birth unknown
Year of birth unknown
Year of death unknown
Kings of the Thuringians